Modest is a free, open-source, email client developed by Nokia's maemo project. Small and lightweight, it is intended for use on hardware with “modest” resources, in particular Nokia's N800 and N810 Internet Tablets running Internet Tablet OS 2008, as well as the N900 mobile phone running Maemo. Modest is based on the lightweight Tinymail email framework.

History
Modest was released as a public beta on December 11, 2007 and received weekly updates until its first official release as part of the Diablo release of Internet Tablet OS 2008.  It replaced the previous email client osso-email.  It is the default built-in email program for the Nokia N900 running Maemo 5.

See also 

 Maemo
 Tinymail
 Comparison of email clients

References

External links
 Modest Homepage

Email client software for Linux
Free email software
Portable software
Email clients that use GTK